Highbury Vale is a stop on the Nottingham Express Transit tram system in the city of Nottingham near the boundary between the suburbs of Basford and Bulwell. It serves as the main interchange between the Hucknall and Phoenix Park branches of the initial system - however, NET recommends that people alight at the previous stop rather than change at Highbury Vale, due to the lines splitting at Babbington junction, just before the trams reach the stop.

The two separate parts of the tram stop each comprise an island platform flanked by twin tracks. The platform for the Hucknall branch is alongside and parallel to the Robin Hood railway line that links Nottingham and Worksop. The tram and railway tracks are separated by a fence, and there is no stop on the railway line. Between the two platforms is a small open space, and on the connecting footpath is a display indicating which platform to go to for the next city tram. Immediately to the west of the platform on the Phoenix Park, the twin tracks merge into the single track branch.

With the opening of NET's phase two, Highbury Vale is now the more northerly of the two junctions on the NET, where line 1, from Hucknall, meets line 2, from Phoenix Park. South of Highbury Vale the two lines run together through the city centre to a junction just south of Nottingham railway station. Here the two lines split again, with line 1 continuing to Beeston and Chilwell, and line 2 to Wilford and Clifton. Trams on each line run at frequencies that vary between 4 and 8 trams per hour, depending on the day and time of day, combining to provide up to 16 trams per hour on the common section.

Gallery

References

External links

Nottingham Express Transit stops